Virus is the tenth studio album works of Indonesian music group, Slank. Which was released in 2001. It contains 13 songs with the song Virus and # 1 as the hits singles this album

Track listing

Slank albums
2001 albums

Personnel
Bimbim – drums, percussion, backing vocals
Kaka – lead vocals, percussion
Abdee Negara – lead guitar, slide guitar, tambourine, mixing
Ridho Hafiedz – rhythm guitar, acoustic guitar, piano
Ivanka – bass, tambourine